Zhang Hao (张灏 Guangxi, 26 February 1978) is a Chinese triple jumper. Her personal best jump is 14.22 metres, achieved in June 2003 in Nanning.

She won the bronze medal at the 2003 Asian Championships. She competed at the 2004 Olympic Games, but without reaching the final round.

Achievements

References

1978 births
Living people
Chinese female triple jumpers
Athletes (track and field) at the 2004 Summer Olympics
Olympic athletes of China
Asian Games medalists in athletics (track and field)
Athletes (track and field) at the 2002 Asian Games
Asian Games silver medalists for China
Medalists at the 2002 Asian Games